Covered: Recorded Live at Capitol Studios (simply shortened as Covered) is the seventh album by American musician Robert Glasper. It was released on June 16, 2015, via Blue Note Records. Recording sessions took place at Capitol Studios in Hollywood on the 2nd and 3rd December 2014. Production was handled by Robert Glasper himself, with Don Was and Nicole Hegeman serving as executive producers. It features song covers of artists like John Legend, Radiohead and Joni Mitchell with a few original tracks mixed in. Harry Belafonte, Iskinder "Skindoo" Adefris-Yaxley, Josiah Xavier Brown, Musiq Soulchild, Ralphie "Hoop" Richardson, Riley Kirkland Glasper and Samuel Josef Brown have provided special guest appearances on the project.

The album peaked at number 190 on the Billboard 200 and number two on both the Traditional Jazz Albums and Jazz Albums charts in the United States. It was also nominated for a Grammy Award for Best Jazz Instrumental Album at the 58th Annual Grammy Awards, but lost to John Scofield's Past Present.

Background
For this album, Glasper reunited with Vicente Archer and Damion Reid as The Robert Glasper Trio with whom he released Canvas and In My Element and went back to the instrumentation of his earlier sounds. Glasper used material from artists such as Radiohead, John Legend, Joni Mitchell, Kendrick Lamar and Jhené Aiko several different music genres to give a more straight forward sound than he put out with his other band. Four of the twelve tracks on the album were at least partially written by Glasper himself.

Critical reception

Covered was met with generally favorable reviews from music critics. At Metacritic, which assigns a normalized rating out of 100 to reviews from mainstream publications, the album received an average score of 74 based on eight reviews.

AllMusic's Thom Jurek praised the album, writing "this set is welcoming, open, and warm: it invites fans of all of his musical pursuits along for the ride". Rob Caldwell of PopMatters wrote that the album "stands, in the end, as a multi-layered work possessing an air of adventure, while still remaining accessible. It's a rewarding collection by one of the most significant composers and interpreters in contemporary jazz". John Fordham of The Guardian wrote: "quotes on black self-respect from Harry Belafonte and the haunting sound of a piano-shadowed children's chorus namechecking African-Americans who have died at police hands furnish some sobering context for a warm, musical and humane Glasper venture". Another PopMatters reviewer, Will Layman, stated: "on Covered Glasper does not try to answer his critics directly, but he certainly plays both wonderfully and from the heart". Marcus J. Moore of Pitchfork wrote: "it's a no-frills record that recedes into the background without much fuss, which works for and against the album's overall impact". Chris Barton of Los Angeles Times resumed: "amid so much rewarding yet familiar ground, Covered sounds more like a step sideways rather than forward".

Track listing

Personnel

The Robert Glasper Trio
Robert Glasper – piano, arrangement
Vicente Archer – bass
Damion Reid – drums

Other musicians
Taalib "Musiq Soulchild" Johnson – featured artist (track 6)
Harold "Harry Belafonte" Bellanfanti Jr. – featured artist (track 11)
Iskiner "Skindoo" Adefris-Yaxley – featured artist (track 12)
Josiah Xavier Brown – featured artist (track 12)
Ralphie "Hoop" Richardson – featured artist (track 12)
Riley Kirkland Glasper – featured artist (track 12)
Samuel Josef Brown – featured artist (track 12)

Production
Robert Glasper – producer
Keith Lewis – engineering, mixing
Hayden Miller – art direction, design
Don Q. Hannah – photography
Mitch Blackman – booking

Charts

References

External links

2015 albums
Robert Glasper albums
Blue Note Records albums
Albums recorded at Capitol Studios